Lavern "Lee" Edward Roberson (November 24, 1909 – April 29, 2007) was an American  pastor and evangelist. He was the founder of Tennessee Temple University and Temple Baptist Seminary in Chattanooga, Tennessee, and Camp Joy, in Harrison, Tennessee.

Early life

Roberson was born in a two-room log cabin and spent his first two years on a farm near English, Indiana, a small town in the southern part of the state. Originally named Lavern Edward, he was known throughout his life as "Lee." In 1911, his parents, Charles E. and Dora (Sego) Roberson, took him to a farm near Louisville, Kentucky, where his father farmed, worked on streetcars, and built homes to make a living.  In 1923, at the age of fourteen, he was led to the Lord by his Sunday School teacher, Mrs. Daisy Hawes, and joined the Cedar Creek Baptist Church near Louisville.

Education

After spending two years at the Louisville Male High School, where he received a diploma in public accounting when he was fourteen years old, Roberson then attended the Fern Creek High School, where he played football and graduated after four years.

Roberson entered Old Bethel College in Russellville, Kentucky, in 1926, and completed one year there. There he worked at various jobs from washing dishes to scrubbing floors to pay his way. From Old Bethel College, he went to the University of Louisville to complete his college work with a major in history. He also continued his education at the Southern Baptist Theological Seminary in Louisville, where he studied under Dr. A.T. Robertson. At the age of nineteen, he was called by a church in Jeffersontown, Kentucky, but he did not accept.

In his early years, Roberson was well known as a singer. Having studied at the Cincinnati Conservatory of Music and with the well-known teacher, John Samples, of Chicago, his services as a vocalist were in great demand. He served as a soloist on the staff of radio station WHAS of Louisville and WSM in Nashville, Tennessee. Roberson was offered a contract by Gaetano Salvatore de Luca at the Nashville Conservatory of Music. After a discussion with de Luca, Roberson decided to give up musical performance, and declined on the grounds that such a music career was not in accordance with his divine calling to the ministry.

Ministry
The first church that Roberson served as pastor was in Germantown, Tennessee, while he was in college. In 1932, he was called to be pastor of the Temple Baptist Church in Greenbrier, Tennessee. It was there that he began emphasizing the Second Coming of Christ. After three years with the Greenbrier church, Roberson entered full-time evangelistic work in 1935.

Roberson served as evangelist of the Birmingham Baptist Association. Within two years he had conducted some fifty revivals in the Birmingham area. On the first Sunday in November 1937, Lee Roberson became pastor of the First Baptist Church in Fairfield, Alabama. In 1939, he was asked to be the state evangelist for Alabama, but he declined.

After five years with the Fairfield church, Roberson was called by the Highland Park Baptist Church in Chattanooga in November 1942. Four years later, Roberson founded Tennessee Temple University and Zion College. Two years later in 1948, a theological seminary, Southeastern Baptist Seminary (renamed Temple Baptist Seminary in 1954) was added. His ministry would continue to branch out to radio via WDYN, a citywide bus ministry, and the founding of Camp Joy. At one point in the 1980s, Highland Park Baptist Church boasted 57,000 members, making it one of the largest churches in the United States.

Roberson preached his last service as pastor of Highland Park Baptist Church on April 27, 1983, but continued preaching across the nation and publishing many books until his death.

Family 
In Birmingham, Roberson met Caroline Allen (1915-2005); they married on October 9, 1937. They had four children: LeeAnne (b. May 2, 1941; d. June 15, 2008), Joy Caroline (b. June 6, 1946; d. August 10, 1946), John, and June. Joy's premature death as an infant led to the establishment of Camp Joy.

Death
Roberson died on April 29, 2007, two years after his wife's death. He was buried in Greenwood Cemetery in Chattanooga, Tennessee.

Books
Diamonds in the Rough—Sword of the Lord Pub
Disturbing Questions...Solid Answers—Sword of the Lord Pub
Double-Breasted—Sword of the Lord Pub
Gold Mine, The—Sword of the Lord Pub
Preaching to America—Sword of the Lord Pub
Ten Thousand Tears—Sword of the Lord Pub
The Faith that Moves Mountains—Sword of the Lord Pub
The Man In Cell No. 1—Sword of the Lord Pub
Touching Heaven—Sword of the Lord Pub
Coming to Chattanooga Soon—Sword of the Lord Pub
Big 90, The—Sword of the Lord Pub

References

Bibliography
 Reese, Edward. The Life and Ministry of Lee Roberson. Glenwood, Ill: Fundamental Publishers, 1975.
 Terry, Lindsay. A Daring Faith in a Hazardous World: Build a Courageous Lifestyle with Lee Roberson. Greenville, SC: Ambassador Emerald International, 2006.
 Wigton, James H. Lee Roberson -- Always About His Father's Business. Xulon Press, 2010.

1909 births
2007 deaths
Bethel College (Kentucky) alumni
University of Louisville alumni
Southern Baptist Theological Seminary alumni
People from Chattanooga, Tennessee
Heads of universities and colleges in the United States
People from Crawford County, Indiana
Tennessee Temple University
Louisville Male High School alumni
Fern Creek High School alumni
Baptists from Tennessee
20th-century American male writers
20th-century Baptist ministers from the United States
20th-century American academics